Recycled wool, rag wool or shoddy is any woollen textile or yarn made by shredding existing fabric and re-spinning the resulting fibres. Textile recycling is an important mechanism for reducing the need for raw wool in manufacturing.

Shoddy was invented by Benjamin Law of Batley in 1813. It was the dominant industry of a number of neighbouring towns in the West Riding of Yorkshire, known as the Heavy Woollen District, throughout the 19th and early 20th centuries. Following its decline in the United Kingdom, the centre of the shoddy trade shifted to the city of Panipat in India. Efforts have been made to revive the British recycled wool industry in recent years.

Terminology 
Historically, recycled wool products were called rag wool. Manufacturers distinguished between three main categories of rag wool:

 Shoddy – made from loosely woven or "soft" textiles that could be pulled apart relatively easily;
 Mungo – made from "hard" fabrics such as felts, that were harder to disintegrate but resulted in a finer product;
 Extract – made from the wool portion of cotton/wool blended fabrics.

In practice, few outside the industry were aware of these distinctions, even when rag wool was widely used. The common name was shoddy, which subsequently became a generalised term for poor quality goods. It is still used as a technical term for recycled wool within the industry.

Regulators in the United States make a distinction between reprocessed wool, which is made from manufactured wool products that were never used by the consumer, and reused wool, which has been used by the consumer. Other bodies refer to these as pre-consumer and post-consumer waste material.

The terms virgin wool and new wool are used to distinguish newly-produced, never-used wool from shoddy.

References 

Wool
Recycling